The following is a list of characters that appear in ACCA: 13-Territory Inspection Dept.

Characters

One of the many members of ACCA, Jean is the second-in-command of the ACCA inspection agency, a small branch that monitors the other branches. He is a compulsive smoker, always carrying around his trademark cigarette case, earning him the title of "cigarette peddler". He is also absent minded, often forgetting his lighter despite his smoking habit. He maintains a dull uninterested demeanor, but has proven himself to be rather intelligent.

A friend of Jean's, who is believed to be a freelance reporter, but is in fact a surveillance officer of ACCA, under the name of Crow, a fact not even the inspection agency is privy to.

 Jean's sister and building manager of the building they both stay in.

ACCA Five Chief Officers

One of the five heads of ACCA. He is a silent and enigmatic man, with long white hair. He believes that Jean is involved with a rumored coup d'etat. He's from the Rokkusu District.

One of the five heads of ACCA. He is a dark-skinned man, who believes that Jean is not involved with the rumored coup d'etat.  He is from a prestigious family in the Furawau District, a place based on India.

One of the five heads of ACCA. He is from the Yakkara District.

One of the five heads of ACCA. he has long curly blond hair, and a thin mustache. He is from the Suītsu District, and is of noble birth.

One of the five heads of ACCA. He is from the Jumōku District.

ACCA Headquarters

The Director-General of ACCA, who believes that a coup d'etat is brewing and enlists Jean's help to convey any rumors about it to her.

ACCA Inspection Department

Head of the ACCA inspection agency. It is later revealed that he is actually Abend, Princess Schnee's aide, in disguise.

ACCA Officers from Different Branches

Fāmasu branch supervisor. She is diligent and looks up to Jean.

Bādon branch supervisor.

Bādon branch staff. He is a rookie policeman, with a distaste for the privileged upper class. He initially believes that Jean is part of the upper class, until he is corrected. He occasionally conducts back-door deals. He is in love with Lotta.

Jumōku branch supervisor. A short man, an unusual sight in the Jumōku district.

Suītsu branch supervisor. On being transferred to the Suitsu district, he saw the situation and began helping the rebels with their coup.

Suītsu branch staff. He was involved in a coup within the Suitsu district, but was freed. After being freed he was dismissed from his post.

Birra branch supervisor.

Birra branch chief.

Rokkusu branch supervisor.

Hare district chief

Hare branch supervisor.

Hare branch chief.

Dowa Kingdom

 Heir to the Dowa Kingdom's throne. He is interested in Lotta for mysterious reasons.

Prince Schwann's bodyguard.

Captain of the Dowa Guards Corps.

Other Characters

References

ACCA: 13-Territory Inspection Dept.